Chloealtis is a genus of slant-faced grasshoppers in the family Acrididae. There are about five described species in Chloealtis.

Species
These five species belong to the genus Chloealtis:
 Chloealtis abdominalis (Thomas, 1873) i c g b (Rocky Mountain sprinkled locust)
 Chloealtis aspasma Rehn & Hebard, 1919 i c g b (siskiyou slant-face grasshopper)
 Chloealtis conspersa (Harris, 1841) i c g b (sprinkled grasshopper)
 Chloealtis dianae (Gurney, Strohecker & Helfer, 1964) i c g b (Diana black-side grasshopper)
 Chloealtis gracilis (McNeill, 1897) i c g b (graceful slant-face grasshopper)
Data sources: i = ITIS, c = Catalogue of Life, g = GBIF, b = Bugguide.net

References

Further reading

 
 
 
 

Gomphocerinae
Acrididae genera
Taxonomy articles created by Polbot